Tulosesus velatopruinatus is a species of mushroom producing fungus in the family Psathyrellaceae.

Taxonomy 
It was first described as Coprinus velatopruinatus by the mycologist Harold Bohn Bender in 1989.

In 2001 a phylogenetic study resulted in a major reorganization and reshuffling of that genus and this species was transferred to Coprinellus.

The species was known as Coprinellus velatopruinatus until 2020 when the German mycologists Dieter Wächter & Andreas Melzer reclassified many species in the Psathyrellaceae family based on phylogenetic analysis.

Habitat and distribution 
In 2008 a fungi survey of Clumber Park in Nottinghamshire, England resulted in observations of this species after a heavy summer rain. It is rarely recorded in England.

References

velatopruinatus
Fungi described in 1989
Fungi of Europe
Tulosesus